

Great Britain
Bermuda – William Popple, Governor of Bermuda (1755–1763)
Gibraltar – Edward Cornwallis, Governor of Gibraltar (1761–1776)
Jamaica – William Lyttleton, Governor of Jamaica (1762–1766)
Province of Massachusetts Bay – Sir Francis Bernard, Governor (1760–1769)

Portugal
 Angola – António de Vasconcelos, Governor of Angola (1758–1764)
 Macau – Antonio de Mendonca Corte-Real, Governor of Macau (1761–1764)

Colonial governors
Colonial governors
1762